Arnaz is a surname. Notable people with the surname include:

Desi Arnaz (1917–1986), Cuban American musician, actor, and television producer
Desi Arnaz Jr. (born 1953), American actor and musician
Eva Arnaz (born 1958), Indonesian film actress
Lucie Arnaz (born 1951), American actress